The Battle of Decatur was a demonstration conducted from October 26 to October 29, 1864, as part of the Franklin-Nashville Campaign of the American Civil War. Union forces of 3–5,000 men under Brig. Gen. Robert S. Granger prevented the 39,000 men of the Confederate Army of Tennessee under Gen. John B. Hood from crossing the Tennessee River at Decatur, Alabama.

Background
John Bell Hood was marching through northern Alabama on his way to an invasion of Union-held Tennessee. His army had departed northwest from the vicinity of Atlanta, Georgia, in late September 1864, hoping their destruction of Union supply lines would lure Maj. Gen. William T. Sherman's Union army into battle. Sherman pursued Hood as far as Gaylesville, Alabama, but decided to return his army to Atlanta and instead conduct a March to the Sea through Georgia. He gave responsibility for the defense of Tennessee to Maj. Gen. George H. Thomas at Nashville.

Hood departed from Gadsden, Alabama, on October 22, en route to Guntersville, Alabama, where he planned to cross the Tennessee River. However, he later learned from cavalry Brigadier General Phillip Roddey that crossing place was strongly guarded, while Decatur, forty miles west, was said to be "lightly guarded". Concerned over the possibility of Federal gunboats destroying any pontoon bridge he might deploy, along with the absence of Nathan Bedford Forrest's horsemen to bring him intelligence, Hood changed his course to Decatur.

Battle

When Hood arrived at Decatur on October 26, he found a Federal infantry force of 3,000 to 5,000 men defending an entrenched line that included two forts and 1,600 yards of rifle pits; a much heavier force than Roddey had believed. Two Federal gunboats patrolled the river. General George Thomas, in Nashville, sent supplies and reinforcements to Decatur along with orders to "defend Decatur to the last extremity." On October 27, Hood arranged his army as it arrived to encircle Decatur. Meanwhile, the Union continued to pour reinforcements into Decatur which arrived just in time to fill gaps in the wavering Union lines. The next morning, he sent Confederate skirmishers through a dense fog to a ravine within 800 yards of the main fortifications. At about noon, a Federal regiment drove the skirmishers out of the ravine, capturing 125 men. "With the soldiers hungry and supplies scarce", Hood knew he could not afford the casualties from a full-scale assault and decided to cross the Tennessee River elsewhere. He marched further the west and crossed near Tuscumbia, Alabama, where Muscle Shoals prevented interference by the Federal gunboats.

Notes

References
 Eicher, David J. The Longest Night: A Military History of the Civil War. New York: Simon & Schuster, 2001. .
 Hood, Stephen M. John Bell Hood: The Rise, Fall, and Resurrection of a Confederate General. El Dorado Hills, CA: Savas Beatie, 2013. .
 Jacobson, Eric A., and Richard A. Rupp. For Cause & for Country: A Study of the Affair at Spring Hill and the Battle of Franklin. O'More Publishing, 2007. .
 Kennedy, Frances H., ed. The Civil War Battlefield Guide. 2nd ed. Boston: Houghton Mifflin Co., 1998. .
 Sword, Wiley. The Confederacy's Last Hurrah: Spring Hill, Franklin, and Nashville. Lawrence: University Press of Kansas, 1993. . First published with the title Embrace an Angry Wind in 1992 by HarperCollins.
 Thrasher, Christopher. Suffering in the Army of Tennessee: A Social History of the Confederate Army of the Heartland from the Battles for Atlanta to the Retreat from Nashville. University of Tennessee Press, 2021.
 National Park Service battle description
 Update to the Civil War Sites Advisory Commission Report on the Nation's Civil War Battlefields – State of Alabama
 "Battle of Decatur", Encyclopedia of Alabama.

Further reading
 Carpenter, Noel. A Slight Demonstration: Decatur, October 1864, Clumsy Beginning of Gen. John B. Hood's Tennessee Campaign. Austin, TX: Legacy Books and Letters, 2007. .

External links
 Confederate Cemetery, Decatur, Alabama
 
 

1864 in Alabama
Decatur 1864
Decatur
Decatur 1864
Decatur 1864
Morgan County, Alabama
Limestone County, Alabama
Decatur, Alabama
Huntsville-Decatur, AL Combined Statistical Area
Decatur
October 1864 events